Ivelin Kostov (born 29 January 1986) is a Bulgarian football player, currently playing for Levski Karlovo as a midfielder.

References

External links 
  Profile
 

1986 births
Living people
Bulgarian footballers
Bulgarian expatriate footballers
Bulgarian expatriate sportspeople in Poland
Expatriate footballers in Poland
PFC Beroe Stara Zagora players
PFC Dobrudzha Dobrich players
OFC Sliven 2000 players
PFC Kaliakra Kavarna players
FC Levski Karlovo players
First Professional Football League (Bulgaria) players
Second Professional Football League (Bulgaria) players
Association football midfielders